Thomas Charles Byrne (7 November 1908 – 23 November 1984) was a former Australian rules footballer who played with Carlton and Hawthorn in the Victorian Football League (VFL).

Byrne was recruited by Carlton from Ararat in 1929, playing 4 games before transferring to Williamstown in the VFA mid-season in 1930 where he played 39 games and kicked 33 goals from 1930-33. He represented the VFA in a game against the VFL at Princes Park in June, 1932, which the League won by just 8 points. 

Byrne crossed to Fitzroy in 1934 but did not play a senior match and finished the season with Prahran. He was then recruited by Hawthorn, where he went on to play 61 games and kick 70 goals from 1935-39.

References

External links 

Tom Byrne's profile at Blueseum

1908 births
1984 deaths
Carlton Football Club players
Hawthorn Football Club players
Ararat Football Club players
Australian rules footballers from Victoria (Australia)